The CPC Loop Den Haag (abbreviated for City-Pier-City Loop) is an annual half marathon competition held in the Hague, Netherlands, every mid-March.

The inaugural edition was held in 1975 and featured a 14.5 km course. This was extended to the half marathon distance the following year. The competition has been used as the Dutch half marathon championships on a number of occasions.
The course is a relatively flat one, which lends itself to fast times for athletes. A former men's half marathon world record of 58:33 minutes was set at this race by Samuel Wanjiru in 2007. This remains the men's course record, while Tegla Loroupe is the women's course record holder with her run of 1:07:32 hours from 1998.

The most successful athletes of the CPC race are both Dutch: Carla Beurskens and Marti ten Kate have both topped the podium on four separate occasions. In its earlier editions, Dutch and other Europeans were the most successful athletes. From the 1990s onwards, this changed due to the rise of African, and particularly Kenyan, runners. Kenya's dominance was highlighted by a ten-year undefeated streak in the men's race from 2001 to 2010.

Winners 

Key:

Wins by country

References 

List of winners
Michiels, Frieda et al. (2011-03-13). City-Pier-City Half Marathon. Association of Road Racing Statisticians. Retrieved on 2011-03-17.

External links 

 

Half marathons in the Netherlands
Annual sporting events in the Netherlands
Sports competitions in The Hague